Year 181 (CLXXXI) was a common year starting on Sunday (link will display the full calendar) of the Julian calendar. At the time, it was known as the Year of the Consulship of Aurelius and Burrus (or, less frequently, year 934 Ab urbe condita). The denomination 181 for this year has been used since the early medieval period, when the Anno Domini calendar era became the prevalent method in Europe for naming years.

Events 
 By place 
 Roman Empire 
 Imperator Lucius Aurelius Commodus and Lucius Antistius Burrus become Roman Consuls. 
 The Antonine Wall is overrun by the Picts in Britannia (approximate date).

 Oceania 
 The volcano associated with Lake Taupo in New Zealand erupts, one of the largest on Earth in the last 5,000 years. The effects of this eruption are seen as far away as Rome and China.

Births 
 April 2 – Xian of Han, Chinese emperor (d. 234)
 Zhuge Liang, Chinese chancellor and regent (d. 234)

Deaths 
 Aelius Aristides, Greek orator and writer (b. 117)
 Cao Jie, Chinese court eunuch and official

References